A women's golf tournament was played at the 1900 Summer Olympics. It was the only time women's golf was featured at the Olympics until 2016. There were 10 competitors from 2 nations (France and the United States) at the event, which was played on 3 October at the Compiègne Club. The event was won by Margaret Abbott of the United States, the first American woman Olympic champion (though she did not realize it, unaware that the golf tournament was part of the Olympics). The United States is credited with a medal sweep in the event by the IOC, though (i) medals were not awarded at the time and (ii) many sources list Pauline Whittier (the silver medalist) as Swiss or Abbie Pratt as French (or both). Whittier was an American studying in St. Moritz. Pratt was an American who spent significant time in Europe and competed under the auspices of the (French) Dinard Golf Club.

Abbott's mother, Mary Abbott also competed in the event; it is the only time that a mother and daughter have competed in the same Olympic event at the same Games.

Background
In the preparation for the 1900 Games, a Special Advisory Committee led by Jacques de Pourtalès (a cousin of Hermann de Pourtalès, who along with his wife Hélène de Pourtalès won a gold medal in sailing in 1900) proposed a golf tournament be included given that the sport was popular in many countries (though not well known in France). The result was the first Olympic golf tournament, held at the Compiègne golf club. Divisions for both men and women, as well as a men's handicap division (not considered Olympic) were set.

Golf would be held again in 1904, with an individual and team men's events that year. In 1908 (which would have again been a men-only event), a dispute among the host nation's golfers resulted in all the British competitors boycotting and the event being cancelled. The sport would not be held again at the Olympics until 2016, when women's individual golf was played again.

Competition format

The women's event consisted of a 9-hole stroke play tournament. The scores for each of the 9 holes were summed to give a total for each player, with the lowest score winning. In the event of a tie, a replayed hole would be used.

Schedule

Results
The women played half a round (9 holes) on 3 October.

References

Sources
 International Olympic Committee medal winners database
 
 

Golf at the 1900 Summer Olympics
1900 in women's golf
Golf
Golf